Mohnyin Tjin, (also Mon Nyin Jin, Mohn-hnyin Gyin) is a popular Burmese cuisine fermented food dish of vegetables preserved in rice wine and various seasonings. It is similar to Korean Kimchi and Japanese Takana Tsukemono. Mohnyin Tjin is popularly associated with the Shan and is a ubiquitous condiment for Shan dishes such as meeshay and shan khauk swè.

Mohnnyin tjin is refers to a wide number of pickled and fermented vegetables. The name means "sour mustard green" and pickled white radish leaves are also used in the most common version.

Generically 'a-chin' (pickle) can be made from almost any vegetable.

Main Ingredients
The most common form of mohnyin tjin is actually a mix of mainly white radish leaves, with mustard greens, carrots, leek bulbs, ginger and Garlic chives. These vegetables are pickled in glutinous rice, rice wine, fresh crushed chillis, spices and cane sugar.

The variety is achieved by substituting the vegetables. Other popular 'a-chin' are made with baby elephant garlic, white radish stems, garlic chives, cabbage, cauliflower, chili pepper, bean sprouts, unripe mangoes and bamboo shoots.

See also

External links
 Shan Pickle - EatingAsia recipe

Burmese cuisine
Pickles
Plant-based fermented foods